The IMA Journal of Applied Mathematics is a publication of Oxford University Press on behalf of the Institute of Mathematics and its Applications. Created in 1965, the Journal covers topics related to the application of mathematics.

References

External links 
 Journal homepage
 Submission website
 Institute of Mathematics and its Applications

Oxford University Press academic journals
Mathematics journals
Publications established in 1965
Bimonthly journals
Hybrid open access journals